Name days in Bulgaria are name days associated with Eastern Orthodox saints. Some names can be celebrated on more than one day.

According to the tradition, guests are supposed to come uninvited and the person who has the celebrated name is supposed to be prepared to treat everyone. Today people prefer to invite their guests at home or at a bar or a restaurant. The celebrations are similar to those of birthdays, but usually the food, the music and the feel is somewhat more traditional, and sometimes even religious.

January
1 : Vassil, Vesselin, Vasilena (on Vassilyovden)
2 : Silvia
3 : Jake , Zarina
4 : Tihomir
6 : Yordan, Bozhidar, Bogdan (on Bogoyavlenie; Yordanovden)
7 : Ivan, Yoan, Yoana (on Ivanovden)
11 : Bogdan, Bogdana, Bogomil, Teodosii
12: Tania, Tatiana (on SvetaTatiana)
14 : Adam, Kalcho, Nina
17 : Anton, Andon, Antonia, Donka, Doncho, Toni, Toncho (on Antonovden)
18 : Atanas, Atanaska, Nasko, Naska, Nacho, Tanyo, Tinka (on Atanasovden)
20 : Evtim
21 : Valeri, Valeria, Maksim
24 : Ksenia
25 : Grigor, Grigorena

February
1 : Lozan, Trifon (on Trifon Zarezan)
3 : Simeon, Simona, Mona, Monchо
4 : Zheko, Zhelyaz, Zhelyazko, Zhechka, Zhechko, Zhecho (also alternative spellings Jeko, Jeliaz, Jechka, Jechko)
5 : Dobrin, Dobrinka
6 : Doroteya, Ognyan, Ognyana, Plamen, Plamena, Svetla, Svetlana, Svetozar, Svetlozar, Fotina
10 : Valentin, Valentina, Valya, Lambi
13 : Evlogi, Zoya, Zhivko Zhivka

March
1 : Evdokia, Marta (on Baba Marta)
4 : Gera, Gerasim, Gercho
6 : Krasimir, Krasimira
9 : Mladen, Mladena
10 : Galin, Galina, Galya
13 : Nikifor
17 : Alexi
19 : Daria
20 : Svetla, Svetozar
22 : Rosen, Rosica
24 : Zahari, Hari
25 : Blagovest, Blagovesta, Blagoy, Blaga, Bonka, Boncho
26 : Gabriela
28 : Albena, Boyko, Boyka, Boyan, Boyana

April
1: Avram 
6 : Strahil
14 : Martin, Martina, Marta
18 : Viktor, Viktoria
25 : Mark, Marko

May
1 : Maya
2 : Boris, Borislav, Borislava, Boryana (on Saint tzar Boris)
5 : Irina, Irena, Miroslav, Mircho, Miroslava, Mira, Miro
6 : Galin, Galina, Galya, Ganka, Gancho, Genko, Genoveva, Georgi, Gergana, Gergin, Gergina, Ginka, Gyuro, Zhorzh (on Gergyovden)
8 : Radoslav
9 : Hristofor
11 : Kiril, Kiro, Kirilka, Metodi, Metodiy, Metodiya (13 days before St. Cyril and St. Methodius' day)
20: Lidia, Lida
21 : Constantin, Dinko, Elena, Eleonora, Eli, Elin, Elka, Ilona, Koycho, Konstantin, Kosta, Kostadin, Kostadinka, Kostadinko, Kuncho, Lenko, Stanimir, Stanimira, Stanka, Stoil, Trayko
24 : Kiril, Kiro, Kirilka, Metodi, Metodiy, Metodiya
29: Brittany

June
04 : Desislava,Desislav
10 : Antonina
15 : Avgustin, Vitan, Vitomir
20 : Biser, Bisera
21 : Yavor, Yasen
24 : Bilyana, Encho, Enyo, Yanka, Yanko, Yancho, Yanaki, Yana, Yani, Yanislav (on Enyovden)
29 : Kamen, Pavel, Pavlin, Pavlina, Peyo, Penka, Pencho, Petrana, Petar, Petya, Petso (on Petrovden)
30 : Apostol

July
1 : Dame, Damyan, Kuzman 
7 : Delcho, Delyo, Nedelcho, Nedelya, Nedyalko, Nedko, Neli, Neshka, Neda, Nedelina
11 : Olga, Oleg
15 : Vladimir, Vladislav, Gospodin, Gospodinka
16 : Yulia, Yulian, Yuliana
17 : Marin, Marina, Marinka, Marinela
18 : Emil, Emilia, Emiliana, Emilian
20 : Iliya, Iliyan, Iliyana, Ilina, Ilka, Ilko, Lilo (on )
22 : Lena, Magda, Magdalena, Manda, Meglena, Miglena
24 : Yana, Yanka, 
25 : Ana, Anna, Anka, Aneliya, Aneta, Ani
27 : Panteley, Panko, Panto
29 : Kalin

August
2 : Ilia, Ilija, Eliya
8 : Emil, Emilia, Emiliana, Emilian
15 : Mara, Marian, Mariana, Maria, Mariya, Mariyan, Mariyana, Masha, Mika, Mira (on Golyama Bogoroditza) 
20 : Samuil
23 : Valko
26 : Adrian, Adriana, Natalia
29 : Anastas
30 : Aleko, Alexandra, Alexander, Sasha, Sasho (on Alexandrov Den)
31 : Genadi

September
1 : Simeon, Mona, Moncho (on Simeonovden)
5 : Elza, Elisaveta, Izabela, Zahari, Svetozar, Svetlozara
8 : Maria
14  : Krastan, Krastina, Kristina, Kristiana, Krastyo, Kristal, Kancho, Stavri (on Krastyovden)
16 : Lyudmil, Lyudmila
17 : Vera, Verka, Vyara, Lyuba, Lyuben, Lyubov, Lyubomir, Nadezhda, Nadya, Sevda, Sofia (on Sveta Sofia)
22 : Galabin, Galabina

October
6 : Toma, Tomi
11 : Filip
14 : Paraskeva, Penka, Pencho, Petka, Petko (on Petkovden)
18 : Zlatan, Zlatka, Zlatko, Zlatomir, Luka, Lukan
26 : Dimitrina, Dimitar, Dima, Dimo, Dragan, Mitro, Mitra (on Dimitrovden)
27 : Nestor
28 : Lachezar

30 : Zornitza, Zorka, Zoran

November
8 : Angel, Angelina, Gavril, Emil, Emilia, Emiliana, Emilian, Lina, Mila, Milen, Milena, Milyo, Mihaela, Mihail, Mihaila, Ognyan, Plamen, Rayko, Rayna, Raycho, Rangel, Rafail, Raya, Rusi, Ruska,Reni, Serafim, Ruslan (on Arhangelovden)
11 : Victor, Victoria, Mina, Minka, Mincho
14 : Filip, Filyo
16 : Matey
23 : Alexandra, Alexander, Tsanka, Tsanko
24 : Ekaterina, Katerina, Katya, Tinka (only female form, on Sveta Ekaterina)
26 : Stiliyan, Stela
30 : Andrea, Andrej (on Andreevden)

December
4 : Varvara
5 : Sava, Savka, Slavi, Slavcho, Sabi, Slav
6 : Nikola, Nikolay, Niki, Nikolina, Nina, Kolyo, Neno, Nenka, Niko (on Nikulden)
9 : Anna, Ana, Anelia, Ani (only female form, on Sveta Anna)
12 : Spiridon, Spiro
15 : Svoboda
17 : Danail, Daniel, Daniela, Danko (on Sv. Danail)
20 : Ignat, Ognyan, Plamen, Iskra (on Ignazhden)
24 : Bistra, Blagorodna, Evgeni, Evgenia, Zheni, Zhechka, Parvan, Parvana
25 : Emil, Itso, Icho, Kristina, Kristian, Mladen, Radomir, Radoslav, Radoslava, Radostin, Radostina, Rumen, Rumyana, Hristina, Hristo, Hristofor (on Christmas)
26 : David, Datso, Dacho, Yosif, Yosko, Hristiana, Hrisitian
27 : Ventsi, Ventsislav, Ventsislava, Zapryan, Sonya, Stamen, Stana, Stanislav, Stanislava, Stanimir, Stanimira, Stanka, Stanko, Stancho, Stefan, Stefana, Stefania, Stefka, Stoil, Stoimen, Stoichko, Stoiko, Stoytcho, Stoyan, Stoyana, Stoyanka, Tanya, Tsanka, Tsanko, Tsona, Tsonka, Tsonko, Tsonyo (on Saint Stefan)

Easter related name days
First Saturday of the Great Lent: Todor(a), Teodor(a), Dora, Bozhidar
Lazarus Saturday: Lazar, Lazarina
Palm Sunday (Eastern Churches): all flower-related names, such as Bilyan(a), Tsveta, Tsvetin(a), Tsvetelin(a), Tsvetan(a), Tsvyatko, Margarita, Liliya, Lilyan(a), Violeta, Yavor, Zdravko, Zjumbjul, Nevena, Kameliya, Temenuzhka, Ralitsa, etc.
Easter Sunday (Eastern Churches): Velichko, Velichka, Veliko, Velin, Vela
Thomas Sunday: Toma, Tomislav, Tomislava
Ascension Sunday: Spas, Spaska

External links
 Incomplete Name Calendar 
Official calendar of the Bulgarian Orthodox Church (in Bulgarian language)

Bulgaria
Bulgarian traditions
Festivals in Bulgaria
Slavic given names

bg:Имен ден